Citayam Station (CTA) is a railway station located right on the border between Bojong Pondok Terong, Cipayung, Depok and Pabuaran, Bojong Gede, Bogor Regency. The station, which is located at an altitude of +120 m amsl, is included in the Operation Area I Jakarta. The station is the southernmost station in Depok and the northernmost in Bogor Regency. The north side of the station is included in the Depok, while the south side included in the Bogor Regency. From this station there is a branch to Nambo Station which is 12.6 km long. This line was originally created to make a loopline from Parung Panjang Station to Sungai Lagoa Station id via Cikarang Station. However, due to the financial crisis in 1998 and the fall of President Soeharto, this line was idle for 2 years.

After 2 years, PT Kereta Api operates Manggarai–Nambo diesel multiple unit route. Unfortunately, due to outdated trains and low occupancy, the line was closed in 2006. Since 1 April 2015, the branch line to Nambo has started serving the KRL Commuterline. To the north of this station, before Depok Station, there used to be the Pondok Terong railway stop which is no longer active due to minimal occupancy and also due to the construction of the Jakarta–Bogor double track.

Building and layout 
This station has two railway tracks. The train branching to  starts from line 1.

Services
The following is a list of train services at the Citayam Station

Passenger services 
 KAI Commuter

Supporting transportation

References

External links 
 Kereta Commuter Indonesia Website (in Indonesian)

Buildings and structures in Depok
Railway stations in West Java
Railway stations opened in 1873